The Webster Hojack Trail is one of two Hojack trails in New York, the other being the Cayuga Hojack Trail. Both are built on remnants of the Hojack, a common name for the Rome, Watertown and Ogdensburg Railroad. The Friends of Webster Trails maintains this  trail, fully within the Town of Webster. It begins at Phillips Road near Route 104 east of the village and runs along the right of way, now owned by Rochester Gas & Electric, to Lake Road.

External links 
 Hojack Trail - Friends of Webster Trails
 Route of the trail

Protected areas of Cayuga County, New York